The Port Chester Clippers were an American minor league baseball team based in Port Chester, New York. In 1947 and 1948, the Clippers hosted home games at Empire Stadium and played exclusively as members of the  Class B level Colonial League, winning the 1948 championship. The 1948 Port Chester Clippers were a minor league affiliate of the St. Louis Browns.

History
Minor league baseball began in Port Chester, New York in 1947 when the Port Chester "Clippers" became members of the six–team  Class B level Colonial League. After folding in 1915, the Colonial League reformed in 1947. The Bridgeport Bees, New London Raiders, Poughkeepsie Giants, Stamford Bombers and Waterbury Timers joined Port Chester as members of the reformed league, beginning play on May 7, 1947.

The Port Chester use of the "Clippers" moniker corresponds with local industry and history. The city was noted to have been an important shipbuilding center with a valued port, which spurred local industry. Steamship service between Port Chester and New York City began in 1870.

In their first season of play, the Port Chester Clippers placed 5th in the Colonial League. The Clippers finished the 1947 regular season with a record of 51–71, playing under manager Al Barillari and missing the four–team playoffs. Port Chester finished 32.5 games behind the pennant winning Waterbury Timers in the regular season standings. Connie Creeden of Port Chester won the Colonial League batting title, hitting .395. Creeden also led the league with 153 hits and was selected to the 1947 Colonial League All–Star team.

In their final season of play, the 1948 Port Chester Clippers became a minor league affiliate of the St. Louis Browns and won the Colonial League championship. In the 1948 regular season, the Clippers on the pennant, as their 85–35 record placed 1st in the regular season, playing under returning manager Al Barillari. Port Chester finished 9.0 games ahead of the 2nd place Poughkeepsie Chiefs in the final regular season standings, which ended on September 7, 1948. In the 1948 playoffs, Port Chester defeated the Waterbury Indians 4 games to 1 to advance. In the Finals, the Clippers defeated the Poughkeepsie Chiefs 4 games to 1 to capture the championship. Pitcher Guy Coleman of Port Chester led the league with 17 wins, while teammate Paul Wargo had 158 strikeouts to lead the Colonial League. Guy Coleman (P), Joe Mellendick (OF), John Miggins (2B), John Pluchino (C), Gary Ruttkay (SS) and Paul Wargo (P) were selected to the Colonial League All-Star team.

In 1948, Port Chester Clipper Carlos Bernier was reportedly one of six black players in organized baseball to begin the season. Jackie Robinson, Larry Doby, Roy Campanella, Hank Thompson and Dan Bankhead were noted to be the other players, as Bernier played his first season of minor league baseball. Other black players began play during the 1948 season. During the 1948 season, Bernier was struck by a pitch that fractured his skull and gave him chronic headaches for the remainder of his life. Also during the season, Bernier was suspended 6 games and fined $25 for an altercation with an umpire. On September 19, 1948 he reportedly hit an inside the park home run in a Finals game against the Poughkeepsie Chiefs.

Despite winning the 1948 championship, Port Chester did not return to the 1949 Colonial League. The Bridgeport Bees also did not return to the league, which added the Bristol Owls and  Kingston Colonials as new franchises replacing Port Chester and Bridgeport. Al Barillari managed the championship Bristol team in 1949.

Port Chester, New York has not hosted another minor league team.

The ballpark
The Port Chester Clippers teams hosted minor league home games at Empire Stadium. The ballpark reportedly had a capacity of 3,500.

Timeline

Year–by–year records

Notable alumni

Al Barillari (1947–1948, MGR)
Ed Boland (1948)
Carlos Bernier (1948)
Chet Covington (1948)
Connie Creeden (1947)
Joe Murray (1947)
Frankie Pack (1948)

See also
Port Chester Clippers players

References

External links
Baseball Reference

St. Louis Browns minor league affiliates
Baseball teams established in 1947
Baseball teams disestablished in 1948
Port Chester, New York
Colonial League teams